La de la Mochila Azul (The girl with the blue backpack) is the debut studio album by Mexican recording artist Pedrito Fernández, (Pedro) released in 1978 by Columbia Records and on Epic Records and CBS Records International labels in Mexico, Spain, Ecuador and Peru. The album and single 45 were released in the USA and Canada markets in 1980.

The success of "La de la Mochila Azul" was so great that he went on to star in the films, La niña de la mochila azul (1979) and the sequel "La niña de la mochila azul 2" (1981) in which actress Maria Rebeca gave life to the character Amy and he to the child named Raul. The creation of the movie put a name and a face to the girl with the blue backpack made famous by Pedrito's song and soon to be classic films.

Thirty years later as Pedro Fernández performed the song as part of his repertoire at the sold out National Auditorium concert in 2009, the record had already sold over 20 million copies.

In 2016 and more than 39 albums later, the record continues to sell, the title song is still requested at Pedro's concerts. Pedro always obliges his fans at concerts with at least a portion of the song which they all sing along with and to him.

Track listing

See also
La niña de la mochila azul

References

External links
 Pedro Fernandez – Official Website
 Pedro Fernández Music
 Pedrito Fernández La de la Mochila Azul from the movie 1979
 Pedro Fernández La de la Mochila Azul live in concert 2010

1978 debut albums
Pedro Fernández (singer) albums
Epic Records albums